The Cape Times is an English-language morning newspaper owned by Independent News & Media SA and published in Cape Town, South Africa.

 the newspaper had a daily readership of 261 000 and a circulation of 34 523. By the fourth quarter of 2014, circulation had declined to 31 930.

History 

The Cape Times had its origins in the great economic and social boom years that followed the Cape's attainment of "Responsible Government" (local democracy) in 1872. The first edition of the newspaper, a small four-page sheet, was published on 27 March 1876 by then editor Frederick York St Leger. St Leger was assisted by Richard William Murray Jnr, whose father of the same name had been one of the founding partners of the Cape Argus. It was the first daily paper in southern Africa, and soon became one of the principal newspapers of the Cape. 
Modelled on The Times, its primary target was the poor working class, as it attempted to expose early government corruption.

Later bought by Irish group Independent News and Media, the South African portion, including the Cape Times, was sold to Sekunjalo Investments (Independent News and Media SA) in 2013.

Supplements 
Business Report (Mon-Fri) 
Career Times (Mon)
Drive Times (Thur)
Top Of The Times (Fri)
Book Times (Once a month)
Escape (Once a month)
Health Times (Once a month)
Play (Once a month)

Criticism
On 16 April 2013 the Cape Times was cautioned by the Press Ombudsman "for untruthfully, inaccurately and unfairly suggesting that a poll showed that the majority of [Israeli] Jews believed that the Jewish state was practicing apartheid." The poll related to a hypothetical situation, whether Palestinians living in the West Bank should be allowed to vote if Israel annexed the territory, rather than the way that Israel was actually being governed at the time. The newspaper was directed to correct its mistake after a complaint by Sidney Kay.

On 28 June 2016 The Press Ombudsman found "The Cape Times has repeatedly made this totally false allegation (stated as fact) on its front page over the course of several months, beginning in November last year."
In July 2016 the Cape Times was again ordered to issue a front-page apology to Premier Helen Zille, after making false allegations that she hired a spy. Despite this, the newspaper has failed to comply with the previous order, as handed down by Judge Bernard Ngoepe, Chair of the Press Council's Appeals Panel.

16 August 2017, veteran journalist Ed Herbst debunked Cape Times claims of it receiving awards, "has run a series of front-page articles claiming that an international media organisation, Newseum, has rated the front page of the Iqbal Survé-owned newspaper as among the best in the world." The reports turned out to be untrue.

Famous staff and contributors 
 Roy Campbell
 Alide Dasnois (editor 2009-13)
 James Matthews
 Sol Plaatje
 William Plomer
 Allister Sparks (columnist)
 Laurens van der Post (reporter 1930s)
 Tony Weaver (Reporter, columnist, opinion editor)
Desmond Young- reporter

Distribution areas

Distribution figures

Readership figures

Estimates of readership are maintained by the SAARF with 95% confidence intervals of about 15%. Within the estimated error readership has remained constant since 2009. Methodological changes introduced in 2009 by SAARF make comparison to previous years difficult.

Sekunjalo Investments 

Two controversies have plagued the paper since its takeover by Sekunjalo Investments in 2013. Most notable of which have been the firing of Cape Times editor Alide Dasnois in December 2013 and accusations of pro-ANC bias in January 2015.

On 6 December 2013, the Cape Times led with a front-page article on the Public Protector's report highlighting irregularities in the awarding of the Sekunjalo Marine Services Consortium tender. The same day, the newspaper's editor, Alide Dasnois, was dismissed from her post by Iqbal Survé, executive chairman of Sekunjalo Investments.

Sekunjalo Investments threatened to sue the paper, Dasnois, and journalist Melanie Gosling over the tender story, but Survé has denied that Dasnois' removal was connected to the article. He instead pointed to the title's declining circulation figures as his primary motivation. Compounded loss of sales, between 2008 and 2012, amounted to 28%, he said.

In response to a perceived attack on press freedom, several organizations have issued statements of support for Dasnois and of concern over editorial independence at the Cape Times. These include Index on Censorship, the International Federation of Journalists, the SA Centre for PEN International, the SA National Editors Forum, the Freedom of Expression Institute, and the Right2Know campaign.

In September 2014 Dasnois filed papers in the South African Labour Court for unfair dismissal and for breech of contract.

See also
 List of newspapers in South Africa

References

External links

Cape Times online edition

Mass media in Cape Town
Daily newspapers published in South Africa
1876 establishments in the Cape Colony
Publications established in 1876
Articles containing video clips